Vavatenina District is a district of northeast Madagascar. It is part of the Analanjirofo Region.

Communes
The district is further divided into 11 communes:

 Ambatoharanana
 Ambodimangavalo
 Ambohibe
 Ampasimazava
 Andasibe
 Anjahambe
 Maromitety
 Miarinarivo
 Sahatavy
 Tanamarina
 Vavatenina

References

Districts of Analanjirofo